Overtoun Jenda, born in an urban area of the northern part of Malawi, is an American mathematician and recipient of a 2020 Presidential Award for Excellence in Science, Mathematics, and Engineering Mentoring. He is a Professor of Mathematics and Assistant Provost for Special Projects and Initiatives at Auburn University. In 2011, Jenda founded the Southern Africa Mathematical Sciences Association Masamu project for research collaboration.

Education

Jenda earned a Bachelor's of Science with Distinction in Mathematics from the University of Malawi. He received a PhD from the University of Kentucky in 1981. His PhD advisor was Edgar Earle Enochs and the title of his dissertation was On Injective Resolvents.

References

Auburn University faculty
20th-century American mathematicians
21st-century American mathematicians
African-American mathematicians
Year of birth missing (living people)
University of Malawi alumni
University of Kentucky alumni
Living people
20th-century African-American people
21st-century African-American people